Shahoora  is a newly formed tehsil in Pulwama district of Jammu and Kashmir. The tehsil headquarters of Shahoora tehsil is located in Litter town.

Shahoora tehsil comprises about 40 villages, including IGC Lassipora , Chakoora, Pulwama and Wasoora, Pulwama

References

Cities and towns in Pulwama district